The 2018–19 Leicester City season was the club's 114th season in the English football league system and their 51st (non-consecutive) season in the top tier of English football. This was their fifth consecutive season in the 2018–19 Premier League. They also competed in the FA Cup and EFL Cup.

The season covers the period from 1 July 2018 to 30 June 2019.

The season was marred by the death of owner Vichai Srivaddhanaprabha in a helicopter crash outside the King Power Stadium on 27 October, shortly after a 1–1 home draw against West Ham United.

Transfers

Transfers in

Transfers out

Loans in

Loans out

First team squad

Kits

Pre-season

Pre-season friendlies
Leicester City announced that they will play pre-season friendlies against Notts County, Valencia and Lille, with a further two matches against Akhisarspor and Udinese Calcio as part of a tour to Austria.

Competitions

Overview

Premier League

League table

Results summary

Results by matchday

Matches
On 14 June 2018, the Premier League fixtures for the forthcoming season were announced.

FA Cup
The third round draw was made live on BBC by Ruud Gullit and Paul Ince from Stamford Bridge on 3 December 2018.

EFL Cup
The second round draw was made from the Stadium of Light on 16 August. The third round draw was made on 30 August by David Seaman and Joleon Lescott. The fourth round draw was made live on Quest by Rachel Yankey and Rachel Riley on 29 September.

Squad statistics

Appearances
Asterisk (*) indicates player left club mid-season
Hashtag (#) indicates player finished the season out on loan

|}

Top scorers

Awards

Club awards
Leicester's annual award ceremony, including categories voted for by the players and supporters, was held on 7 May 2019. The following awards were made:

Divisional awards

References

Leicester City
Leicester City F.C. seasons